William Washington (born 1885) was a Negro leagues catcher for several years before the founding of the first Negro National League.

In 1909, Washington played catcher for all but one game in a 56-game tour with the Chicago Union Giants. The Giants won all but 10 games in that 56-game tour. During that tour, he caught for Clarence Lytle, Jimmie Lyons, Bennie Lyons, Harry Hyde, Mack Ramsey, and Wesley Prior.

References

External links

Negro league baseball managers
Chicago Giants players
1885 births
20th-century deaths
Year of death missing
20th-century African-American people